Nelly Reifler is an American short story writer and novelist.  She is perhaps best known for her short fiction collection See Through, and her debut novel Elect H. Mouse State Judge,  published by Faber and Faber in August 2013.

Reifler began her career as an assistant to Paul Auster from 1997–2005, co-editing a collection with him titled I Thought My Father Was God.  Her stories have been published in various literary journals, including Failbetter, Black Book, BOMB (magazine), The Fiddleback, Sleepingfish, jubilat, Post Road, and McSweeneys.  She received a Henfield Prize in 1996, won a Literary Death Match in 2010, and was a MacDowell Fellow in 2005.

She teaches creative writing at the Pratt Institute and at Sarah Lawrence College.

Partial bibliography
"Elect H. Mouse State Judge: A Novel" Faber & Faber (August 6, 2013) 

"See Through: Stories" Simon & Schuster (August 26, 2003)

References

American women short story writers
Living people
21st-century American novelists
American women novelists
21st-century American women writers
21st-century American short story writers
Year of birth missing (living people)